Events from the year 2012 in Indonesia

Incumbents

Events

 April 9: Acehnese gubernatorial election, 2012
 April 11: 2012 Indian Ocean earthquakes
 May 9: Mount Salak Sukhoi Superjet 100 crash 
 June 21: 2012 Indonesian Air Force Fokker F27 crash
 June 21: 2012 Indian Ocean migrant boat disaster
 July 11: Jakarta gubernatorial election, 2012
 August 9: Multiply announced that it was closing down its social networking platform and continuing as an e-commerce website instead.

Television

Debuted

 Asmara
 Eat Bulaga! Indonesia
 JKT48 School
 Love in Paris
 Separuh Aku
 Tukang Bubur Naik Haji The Series
 X Factor Indonesia
 Yusra dan Yumna

Ended

 Asmara
 Deal Or No Deal Indonesia
 JKT48 School

Sport

 2012 Indonesia national football team results
 2011–12 Indonesian Premier League
 2011–12 Indonesia Super League
 2012 Piala Indonesia
 2012 Aceh Governor Cup
 2012 Indonesia Open Grand Prix Gold
 2012 Pekan Olahraga Nasional
 2012 ASEAN School Games
 2012 Asian Aerobic Gymnastics Championships
 2012 Asian Women's Handball Championship
 2012 Tour de Singkarak
 Indonesia at the 2012 Summer Olympics
 Indonesia at the 2012 Summer Paralympics
 Indonesia at the 2012 Asian Beach Games

 
Indonesia
2010s in Indonesia
Years of the 21st century in Indonesia
Indonesia